Desun Hospital & Heart Institute is an  NABH accredited hospital and heart research institute of Kolkata, West Bengal, India.

Overview 
Desun hospital was founded by Sajal Dutta in 2008, who pursued Mechanical Engineering from Jadavpur University and post-graduation degree in Business Management from IIM Calcutta (Joka). The hospital has a ten storied building and is spread across 250,000 sq. ft area.

Departments 
The hospital has several departments: 
 Cardiac Sciences department
 Dentistry department
 Dermatology department
 Desun-Onco Care department
 ENT department
 Endocrinology & Diabetology department
 Gastroenterology department
 General & Laparoscopic Surgery department
 Haematology department
 Nephrology department
 Neurology department
 Neuro Psychiatry department
 Obstetrics & Gynecology department
 Oral & Maxillofacial Surgery department
 Orthopedics department
 Ophthalmology department
 Paediatrics department
 Paediatric Surgery department
 Plastic & Reconstructive Surgery department
 Psychiatry department
 Physiotherapy department
 Rheumatology department
 Urology department
 Vertigo & Deafness department

References 

Hospital buildings completed in 2008
Hospitals in Kolkata
Hospitals established in 2008
2008 establishments in West Bengal